Kenneth Henderson Willard (born July 14, 1943) is an American former professional football player who was a running back/fullback in the National Football League (NFL), where he was a four-time Pro Bowler with the San Francisco 49ers in the 1960s.

College career 
He attended the University of North Carolina after turning down Ted Williams and a contract with the Boston Red Sox. He went to Carolina on a football scholarship and also played baseball for the Tar Heels. He is the first UNC athlete to be named to the first-team Academic All-America team and had his portrait placed on Kenan Stadium in 2013 celebrating this honor.

Professional career
Willard was drafted with the second pick of the 1965 NFL Draft, by the San Francisco 49ers ahead of future NFL Hall of Famers Dick Butkus and Gale Sayers. He played nine seasons with the San Francisco 49ers and one with the St. Louis Cardinals. He opted to pass on his eleventh season after two consecutive years of knee injuries in St. Louis.

Willard was a four-time Pro Bowler, selected in 1965, 1966, 1968 and 1969 and scored 45 rushing and 17 receiving touchdowns. He was a member of the 49ers when the team won the NFC West title in 1970, 1971 and 1972 and with the Cardinals when they won the division title in 1974. On the retirement of Leroy Kelly, Willard became the NFL's active leader in career rushing yards for most of the 1974 season, before being passed by O. J. Simpson in Game 11. He retired with 6,105 rushing yards (then 8th all-time) and 45 rushing touchdowns (tied for 12th).

NFL career statistics

Source

Honors
In 1985, he was inducted into the Virginia Sports Hall of Fame and was honored as an ACC football Legend on May 6, 2013.

References

1943 births
Living people
American football running backs
Players of American football from Richmond, Virginia
San Francisco 49ers players
St. Louis Cardinals (football) players
Western Conference Pro Bowl players
North Carolina Tar Heels football players